France competed at the 2012 Summer Olympics in London, between 27 July and 12 August 2012. French athletes have competed in every Summer Olympic Games of the modern era. The French Olympic Committee sent a total of 330 athletes to the Games, 183 men and 147 women, to compete in 24 sports.

France left London with a total of 34 medals—11 gold, 11 silver, and 12 bronze—finishing seventh in the gold medal standings and eighth in the overall medal standings. Most of these medals were awarded to the athletes in judo, cycling, and swimming. Six French athletes won more than a single Olympic medal in London. France's team-based athletes proved successful at these games, as the men's national handball team and the women's national basketball team won gold and silver medals, respectively. Furthermore, the men's national handball team managed to defend its 2008 Olympic title from Beijing. For the first time since 1960, France did not win an Olympic medal in fencing.

Among the nation's medalists were Yannick Agnel and Camille Muffat (retired in 2014 and killed tragically in a helicopter crash one year later), who emerged as France's most successful Olympic swimmers after winning three medals, including a gold, in their events. Meanwhile, Florent Manaudou succeeded his sister Laure with an Olympic gold medal in freestyle swimming. Renaud Lavillenie set a new Olympic record in the pole vault, becoming the third French man to claim the title, and the first to do so since 1996. Tony Estanguet won his third gold medal in the men's slalom canoeing singles, making him one of the most successful French athletes in Olympic history. On 11 August 2012, Estanguet was elected to the IOC Athletes' Commission, along with three other athletes.

Medalists

| width="78%" align="left" valign="top" |

1.Competed in preliminaries but not the final relay.
2.In May 2014, the US 4 × 100 metres relay team member Tyson Gay received a one-year suspension for anabolic steroid use and was stripped of his medals after 15 July 2012 when he first used. In May 2015, the IOC wrote to US Olympic Committee telling them to collect the medals from teammates Trell Kimmons, Justin Gatlin, Ryan Bailey, Jeffery Demps and Darvis Patton. Two of Gay's teammates who ran with him in the final, Kimmons and Bailey, had previously also served suspensions. The medals were reallocated, with Trinidad and Tobago awarded silver, and France taking bronze.

| width="22%" align="left" valign="top" |

Delegation 
The French Olympic Committee selected a team of 330 athletes, 183 men and 147 women, to compete in 24 different sports; it was the nation's third largest team outside the host nation, and the first with the highest percentage of women in Olympic history. France did not qualify teams in field hockey, volleyball and water polo, but did mark its Olympic return to men's basketball after a twelve-year absence.

The French team included past Olympic champions, three of them defending (Greco-Roman wrestler Steeve Guenot, mountain biker Julien Absalon, and the men's national handball team). Equestrian eventing rider Denis Mesples, at age 49, was the oldest athlete of the team, while gymnast Anne Kuhm was the youngest, at age 15. Pistol shooter and former Olympic gold medalist Franck Dumoulin made his sixth appearance, having participated at every Summer Olympics since 1992. Épée fencer and multiple-time Olympic medalist Laura Flessel-Colovic, meanwhile, became the first French female athlete to compete at five separate Olympic Games. Because of her repeated successes in fencing, Flessel-Colovic became France's first female flag bearer at the opening ceremony since 1996.

Other notable French athletes included slalom canoer and multiple-time world champion Tony Estanguet, judoka and Olympic bronze medalist Teddy Riner, swimmer and junior European champion Yannick Agnel, pole vaulter and multiple-time European champion Renaud Lavillenie, and basketballer Tony Parker, who had previously played for the NBA's San Antonio Spurs.

| width=78% align=left valign=top |
The following table lists the number of French competitors who participated in each Olympic sport. Note that reserves in fencing, field hockey, football, and handball are not counted as athletes.

Archery

France qualified three archers for the men's individual event, an archer for the women's individual event and a team for the men's team event:

Athletics

French athletes achieved qualifying standards in the following athletics events (up to a maximum of 3 athletes in each event at the 'A' Standard, and 1 at the 'B' Standard):

Men
Track & road events

* Tested positive for the blood-booster EPO; the IOC ordered him to leave the Olympics on 10 August 2012.

Field events

Combined events – Decathlon

Women
Track & road events

Field events

Combined events – Heptathlon

Badminton

Basketball

The French men's basketball team qualified for the 2012 Olympics by reaching the final of the EuroBasket 2011. The French women's team qualified through the World Qualification Tournament.
 Men's team event – 1 team of 12 players
 Women's team event – 1 team of 12 players

Men's tournament

Roster

Group play

Quarter-final

Women's tournament

Roster

Group play

Quarter-final

Semi-final

Final

Boxing

France qualified boxers in the following events:

Men

Canoeing

Slalom
France qualified boats for all slalom events:

Sprint
France qualified boats for the following sprint events:

Men

Women

Qualification Legend: FA = Qualify to final (medal); FB = Qualify to final B (non-medal)

Cycling

Road
Men

Women

Track
Sprint

Team sprint

Keirin

Omnium

Mountain biking

BMX

Diving

France qualified five quota places for the diving events:

Men

Women

Equestrian

Dressage
France qualified a single quota by rankings:

Eventing
France qualified one team and five quota places in the individual event after finishing in second place at the 2011 European Eventing Championships.

Show jumping
France qualified one team and four quota places in the individual event after finishing in second place at the World Equestrian Games.

Fencing

France qualified 11 fencers.

Men

Women

Football

 Women's team event – 1 team of 18 players

Women's tournament

Roster

Group play

Quarter-final

Semi-final

Bronze medal game

Gymnastics

Artistic
Men
Team

Individual finals

Women
Team

Individual finals

Rhythmic

Trampoline

Handball

France participated in the 2012 Olympics as the defending world men's handball champion, and successfully defended its gold medal from the 2008 Summer Olympics. The French women's team qualified through the World Qualification Tournament.
 Men's team event – 1 team of 14 players
 Women's team event – 1 team of 14 players

Men's tournament

Group play

Quarter-final

Semi-final

Final

Women's tournament

Group play

Quarter-final

Judo

Men

Women

Modern pentathlon

France qualified one man and two women.

Rowing

France qualified boats for the following rowing events:

Men

Qualification Legend: FA=Final A (medal); FB=Final B (non-medal); FC=Final C (non-medal); FD=Final D (non-medal); FE=Final E (non-medal); FF=Final F (non-medal); SA/B=Semifinals A/B; SC/D=Semifinals C/D; SE/F=Semifinals E/F; QF=Quarterfinals; R=Repechage

Sailing

France qualified one boat for each of the following events:

Men

Women
Fleet racing

Match racing

Open

M = Medal race; EL = Eliminated – did not advance into the medal race;

Shooting

France earned 14 quota places for the shooting events at the 2012 Olympics:

Men

Women

Swimming

French swimmers achieved qualifying standards in the following events (up to a maximum of two swimmers in each event at the Olympic Qualifying Time (OQT), and one at the Olympic Selection Time (OST)):

Men

Women

Synchronized swimming

France qualified two Olympic quota places in synchronized swimming.

Table tennis

France qualified one man and two women.

Taekwondo

France had qualified two places in women's taekwondo.

Tennis

France qualified six Olympic tennis players in 2012: four in the men's events and two in the women's events. France ultimately won two medals – one silver and one bronze – in the men's doubles.

Men

Women

Triathlon

France qualified the following triathletes:

Weightlifting

France qualified three men and one woman.

Wrestling

France qualified six quota places:

Men's freestyle

Men's Greco-Roman

Women's freestyle

References

External links
Quota places by nation and name. ISSF.

Nations at the 2012 Summer Olympics
2012
2012 in French sport